The Xitiao River or West Tiao River is located in Zhejiang Province, China. It flows through Huzhou before entering Lake Tai.

References

Rivers of Zhejiang